The Most Reverend Stephen Joseph Donahue (December 10, 1893 – August 17, 1982) was an American bishop of the Roman Catholic Church. He served as an auxiliary bishop of the Archdiocese of New York from 1934 to 1972.

Biography
Stephen Donahue was born in New York City, the fifth of ten children of Thomas P. and Dorothy (née Rentz) Donahue. His father was born in England to Irish parents, and his mother was born in Germany. He received his early education at the parochial school of Holy Name Church, run by the Christian Brothers. He was encouraged by one of his teachers to enter the priesthood.

After graduating from Holy Name School in 1906, he attended Cathedral College. He received the Cardinal's Medal for general excellence upon his graduation; the award was presented to him by the college's president, Father Patrick Joseph Hayes (who later became Archbishop of New York in 1919).

He entered St. Joseph's Seminary in Yonkers in 1912. A year later, he won a scholarship to the Pontifical North American College in Rome, where he studied for five years. While in Rome, Donahue was ordained a priest by Cardinal Basilio Pompili on May 22, 1918.

Following his return to New York, his first assignment was as an instructor of Sacred Scripture and Latin at Cathedral College, where he also served for a time as prefect of discipline. He was a curate at the Church of the Blessed Sacrament and at St. Gregory's Church. In 1920, he became assistant secretary to Cardinal Hayes. He was advanced to secretary in 1922, and remained in that position until 1934. In his capacity as the Cardinal's secretary, he traveled extensively with Hayes, including several trips to Rome. He was named a Monsignor in 1924.

On March 5, 1934, Donahue was appointed Auxiliary Bishop of New York and Titular Bishop of Medea by Pope Pius XI. He received his episcopal consecration on the following May 1 from Cardinal Hayes, with Bishop Edward Mooney and Archbishop John Joseph Mitty serving as co-consecrators, at St. Patrick's Cathedral. He selected as his episcopal motto: Monstra te esse matrem (Latin: "Show thyself a mother"). After his consecration, he was made pastor of his childhood parish of Holy Name Church, and frequently represented Cardinal Hayes at religious conventions and other events. When Cardinal Eugenio Pacelli, then-Vatican Secretary of State and future Pope Pius XII, visited New York in 1936, Donahue took a leading role in greeting him. He also took a special interest in the Legion of Decency, and served as a member of the motion picture committee of the National Catholic Welfare Council.

Donahue served as Apostolic Administrator of New York between the death of Cardinal Hayes and the appointment of Bishop Francis Spellman, and celebrated Requiem Mass for Hayes. After thirty-eight years as a bishop, he resigned on May 3, 1972. He later died at the Mary Manning Walsh Home in Manhattan, aged 88.

References

1892 births
1982 deaths
Clergy from New York City
Saint Joseph's Seminary (Dunwoodie) alumni
20th-century Roman Catholic bishops in the United States
American Roman Catholic clergy of Irish descent